Clifton Springs Hospital & Clinic (CSHC) is affiliate hospital of Rochester Regional Health in the Village of Clifton Springs, New York in the Finger Lakes Region of Ontario County. Clifton Springs Hospital & Clinic is a 262-bed DNV-accredited community hospital and nursing home

History
Clifton Springs Hospital & Clinic was built to replace the Sanitarium Building in 1972. The current building was designed from a vision of Dr. Henry Foster, who believed in holistic healing. The building has grown over 150 years into a modern hospital and clinic, including The Springs Integrative Medicine Center where visitors can receive sulphur baths, massage therapy and other holistic treatments.

Awards and recognition 
 Eli Pick Facility Leadership Award from American College of Health Care Administrators (ACHCA)
 Excellus Blue Cross/Blue Shield Certificate of Excellence 2015 Hospital Incentive Performance Program
 ISO Certified

See also 
 Rochester Regional Health
 Newark-Wayne Community Hospital
 Rochester General Hospital
 Unity Hospital
 United Memorial Medical Center

References 

1972 establishments in New York (state)
Hospitals in Rochester, New York
Hospitals established in 1972